Leonard Zuta (born 9 August 1992) is a Macedonian professional footballer who plays as a left back for Norwegian Eliteserien club Vålerenga.

Club career
Zuta spent the first four seasons of his professional career with BK Häcken in Allsvenskan. He made his official début on 13 April 2012, when he came in as a substitute in a home win against Mjällby AIF. Until late August 2015, Zuta made 57 appearances with Häcken, often featuring in the starting line-up.

On 31 August 2015, Zuta signed a three-year contract with Rijeka in Croatia's 1. HNL. He made his official début for the club on 19 September 2015, in a goalless home draw against Inter Zaprešić, when he entered as a substitute in the 87th minute.
Zuta soon became a first team player during his stint at the club and won Croatian league and cup in 2016–17 season. Zuta also became popular figure to the supporters of Rijeka and was praised on various memes on social media.

On 8 January 2019 Zuta signed for Turkish Süper Lig club Konyaspor.

In September 2020, Zuta signed a two-year contract with Italian Serie B club Lecce, with an option for another year.

On 30 July 2021, Zuta signed a three-year contract with Norwegian Eliteserien club Vålerenga. He was brought in to replace Sam Adekugbe, who had left for Hatayspor.

International career
On 15 June 2015. Zhuta made his début with the Macedonian national team in an away loss to Slovakia. He has earned a total of 15 caps, scoring no goals and his final international was a November 2016 FIFA World Cup qualification match against Spain.

Club statistics

International statistics

Honours
HNK Rijeka
Croatian First Football League: 2016–17
Croatian Football Cup: 2016–17

References

External links
Profile at Macedonian Football 

1992 births
Living people
Footballers from Gothenburg
Swedish people of Macedonian descent
Association football defenders
Swedish footballers
Macedonian footballers
North Macedonia under-21 international footballers
North Macedonia international footballers
BK Häcken players
HNK Rijeka players
Konyaspor footballers
U.S. Lecce players
Vålerenga Fotball players
Allsvenskan players
Croatian Football League players
Süper Lig players
Serie B players
Eliteserien players
Macedonian expatriate footballers
Expatriate footballers in Croatia
Macedonian expatriate sportspeople in Croatia
Expatriate footballers in Turkey
Macedonian expatriate sportspeople in Turkey
Expatriate footballers in Sweden
Macedonian expatriate sportspeople in Sweden
Expatriate footballers in Italy
Macedonian expatriate sportspeople in Italy
Expatriate footballers in Norway
Macedonian expatriate sportspeople in Norway